José Makila Sumanda (born September 20, 1959) is a former Governor of Équateur Province in the Democratic Republic of the Congo. He was Minister of Public Works and Infrastructure from 2005 to 2006 and took office as Governor of Équateur on January 27, 2007 as a member of the Movement for the Liberation of Congo (MLC). He held the position until January 2009, after which he was succeeded by Jean-Claude Bayende.

He was appointed one of three deputy prime ministers, with responsibility for transport and communication, in December 2016.

References

Living people
1959 births
Movement for the Liberation of the Congo politicians
People from the province of Équateur
Governors of provinces of the Democratic Republic of the Congo
Université Laval alumni
Governors of Équateur (former province)
21st-century Democratic Republic of the Congo people